Franklin is an unincorporated community in Dalton Township, Wayne County, in the U.S. state of Indiana.

History
Franklin was platted in 1832. An old variant name of the community was called Nettle Creek.

Geography

References

Unincorporated communities in Wayne County, Indiana
Unincorporated communities in Indiana